Results from Norwegian football (soccer) in the year 1915.

Class A of local association leagues
Class A of local association leagues (kretsserier) is the predecessor of a national league competition. The champions qualify for the 1915 Norwegian Cup.

Smaalenene

Kristiania og omegn

Romerike

Oplandene

Vestfold

Grenland

Group 1

Group 2

Championship final

Telemark

Sørlandske

Position play-offs

Vesterlen

Vidar and Viking withdrew in autumn.

Bergen og omegn

Romsdalske

Rollon became champion after a position play-off.

Nordenfjeldske

Norwegian Cup

First round

|colspan="3" style="background-color:#97DEFF"|12 September 1915

Odd had a walkover.
Lyn (Gjøvik) had a walkover.

Second round

|colspan="3" style="background-color:#97DEFF"|26 September 1915

Kvik (Trondhjem) had a walkover.

Semi-finals

|colspan="3" style="background-color:#97DEFF"|3 October 1915

Final

National team

Sources:

References

External links
RSSSF Football Archive

 
Seasons in Norwegian football